Hardscrabble or Hard Scrabble is land that is rocky or of poor quality, as in the term hardscrabble farm. It is often used as a euphemism for any sort of hard working or poverty, as in hardscrabble childhood. A number of towns use this name:

 Hardscrabble (Harrisburg), Pennsylvania, a former neighborhood in Midtown Harrisburg, Pennsylvania
 Hardscrabble, California, now Ione, California
 Hardscrabble, Colorado, an extinct town in Colorado
 Hardscrabble, Illinois, now Streator, Illinois
 Hardscrabble, Indiana, a town in Indiana
 Hardscrabble, New York, now Farmingdale, New York
 Hardscrabble, Ohio
 Hardscrabble, Ontario, a village incorporated into the town of Hamilton, Ontario, today's Cobourg, Ontario, Canada
 Hardscrabble, Virginia, an unincorporated community in Highland County, Virginia
 Hardscrabble, West Virginia, now Scrabble, West Virginia
 Hardscrabble or Hard Scrabble, Wisconsin, now Hazel Green (town), Wisconsin
 Hard Scrabble and Snow Town, two African-American neighborhoods in 19th-century Providence, Rhode Island
 Hardscrabble Canyon, in the Wet Mountains, in Colorado
 Hardscrabble Pass, in Colorado
 Hardscrabble River, the estuary of Wilson Stream, a small river in Washington County, Maine

Historic sites
 Hardscrabble, a log cabin built by Ulysses S. Grant, now located at Grant's Farm, Grantwood Village, Missouri
 Hardscrabble (Bahama, North Carolina), a historic house
 Hardscrabble Farm, an historic farm property and Greek Revival farmhouse in rural Searsmont, Maine

Other uses
Hardscrabble, a 2012 electronic music album by The Flashbulb
Hardscrabble Open (also known as the Hardscrabble Women's Invitation), a golf tournament played at the Hardscrabble Golf Club (also known as the Hardscrabble Country Club) in Fort Smith, Arkansas from 1945 to 1953; it was an official LPGA Tour event from 1948 to 1950